amaptocare is a large-scale public art work, in the form of a participative sponsored tree-planting project in Ballymun on the Northside of Dublin, Ireland.  Proposed by German conceptual artist Jochen Gerz and commissioned by Breaking Ground on behalf of Dublin City Council's Ballymun Regeneration Limited as a percent for art scheme,  it involved planting semi-mature trees in each neighbourhood of Ballymun, each with a personal comment from its sponsor inscribed on a nearby metal lectern.  Over 630 trees from a choice of 15 mostly native varieties were sponsored, most by locals and other Dubliners, and 620 were planted by 2006.  

amaptocare was the largest and longest-running of the arts projects funded as part of the massive regeneration of Ballymun, on which over 1.5 billion euro was spent.  Begun in 2003, the project formally ended in 2017 - but three elements at Ballymun's civic plaza remain to be completed, namely an illuminated map of the project, inscription of sponsor names, and the planting of the "first fifteen" sponsored trees, one of each variety.  There was a wide welcome for the new trees, and arts critics commented on the positive engagement of the project, but there were also questions from some locals about the mandatory sponsorship element.  Aside from amaptocare, Ballymun Regeneration also engaged in a general tree-planting project.

Origins

As part of the Ballymun Renewal Scheme, which had a planned public sector spend of hundreds of millions of euro, and total plans exceeding 2.5 billion euro, a combined percent for art programme was deployed through the Breaking Ground arts organisation established under the oversight of Dublin City Council's Ballymun Regeneration Limited. Breaking Ground sponsored a range of artworks, but also advertised by open call, in 2002, for a major project. Ultimately, two options were considered: a sculpture by American public artist Jeff Koons, whose works already commanded high prices but some of which were seen as "draws" or tourist attractions, or a participatory public artwork by conceptual artist Jochen Gerz.  Gerz, German-born, Paris-resident, and with dozens of public and participative art projects completed, had visited Ballymun in 2002, and had noticed the lack of trees, commenting "My first reaction was, this is a 'no-fly zone' for birds. It's very mineral, very planned, very geometrical. There is very little organic confidence, as if everybody needed to be planned, as if life could not happen in confidence." 

After further reading in Irish mythology, in which he noted the prominence of trees and woods, Gerz put tree planting at the centre of his project proposal.  He further explained that he saw "the trees as breaking up the public and civic space of Ballymun", which he feared would otherwise be streamlined and anodyne, and that "It's nice to interrupt a little bit the monotony of the computer drawings."  The project fitted within Gerz's "participatory art" area of work, including his perception that active involvement in art is important to democracy and the sense of community, and that the role of artist is not an isolated one: "The division of the world into artists and audiences endangers democracy" and this theme was reflected in the comments by some art critics reviewing amaptocare as discussed in the Reception section below.

The Gerz proposal was selected, and proceeded as the largest, and one of the two highest-funded, Ballymun arts projects, with a budget described as exceeding 250,000 euro, and a duration from December 2003 to December 2017. While some arts-related construction projects have cost much more, amaptocare has even been described as Ireland's largest arts project. amaptocare was commissioned in late 2003 by Aisling Prior, the director of Breaking Ground, who also acted as producer, and was named amaptocare, derived from "a map to care".  The project manager, also working as producer, was Sheena Barrett.  The artist moved with his wife, Laurence Vanpoulle, to Sneem, County Kerry while overseeing amaptocare, and they settled there.

Project

Promotion and tree types
From January 2004, the project advertised locally, inviting people to sponsor a tree, individually or as a family or other group.  Ballymun residents and former residents were the primary targets but donations were accepted from others also.  Most donations were individual but a few were declared for families, at least one for a community of nuns, and at least one for the band Aslan, whose members came from Ballymun and nearby Finglas, and who used to rehearse in a local parish hall, and one for Joe Doyle of The Frames. 

Fifteen mostly native tree varieties were offered (oak, wild cherry, white willow, ash, London plane, evergreen or holm oak, beech, copper beech, birch, lime, maple, cedar, rowan, Scots pine, Sophora japonica). The sponsorship donation ranged from 50 to 250 euro according to type, the most expensive being the evergreen oak.  The idea was to plant semi-mature trees, not small saplings, for a stronger impression and increased probability of survival.  The sponsorship amount was about half the cost of sourcing and planting each tree, after discounted supply by the State forestry company, Coillte, the other half being covered by the scheme's promoters. The sponsorship-participative aspect of the project has been summarised as the "idea that if residents purchased trees they would care more about their environment and that series of single acts would create long term values change in the area."

Operations
The project had offices in the Axis Arts and Community Centre in the civic complex in central Ballymun, and a staff, aside from the artist, of two full-time and several part-time employees, and support from Ballymun Regeneration and its arts advisors. Students from the National College of Art and Design and Dún Laoghaire Institute of Art, Design and Technology interned on the project.

Phase 1 - Trees
In the first phase of the project, with a target of 625 donors, around 635 trees were sponsored, with oak and wild cherry the most-chosen, and just a few of the most costly, the evergreen oak, as well as maple, cedar and pine.  The total contributed by sponsors was around 45,000 euro. Some corporate sponsors, including McInerney and Bruce Shaw, donated trees on behalf of community organisations, as well as the comprehensive school. Each sponsor was invited, over a period of 18 months, to a face-to-face meeting with the artist. At this meeting Gerz explored the concept of the project and worked with the sponsor to develop a short text answering the question "If this tree could speak, what would it say for me?" to be printed on an enamelled plaque or lectern by their chosen tree.  Donors were also asked to choose in which neighbourhood of Ballymun the tree should be planted.  The project reported that the choice of locations proved challenging, due to both the massive demolition and construction work ongoing across Ballymun, and to other, more routine, tree planting work.  

620 trees were planted on a wide range of streets between 2004 and 2006, by Coillte, Ballymun Regeneration and the city council, and the plaques installed adjacent to each, 32 cm from the ground.  In the event of vandalism, of which there was a small initial wave, the lecterns were quickly replaced to maintain continuity, which the project believed led to an abatement in vandalism.  As of 2017, the first 15 trees sponsored had not yet been planted, as they were to be specially sited around the illuminated map of the whole project at Ballymun's civic plaza.

Phase 2 - Civic Plaza / Monument
The second phase of the project was to be the sandblasting of the names of donors into the granite surface of Ballymun's Civic Plaza, and the installation of a 24 metre by 24 metre panel map of the area, with the site of each tree illuminated, and the "first 15" trees sponsored, one of each offered variety, planted around.  The illuminated map was to be produced by Laurent Fachard, founder of Lyon's lighting specialist LEA studio.  

By 2008, it was reported that the second phase was delayed by discussions about Dublin's potential Metro link to Dublin Airport, a stop for which was planned to be located at the civic plaza.  Residents and donors complained about a lack of information on the subject and project progress since the main tree-planting, and Ballymun Regeneration promised to hold meetings on update plans in the near term.  By 2010, the artist expected to conclude the project by 2015 but as of 2017, the names on the plaza, and the map, were still pending.  The artist commented in 2017 both "The Amaptocare work is not completed." and "I still hesitate to write that the work is abandoned." and stated that he was optimistic that the full project would be fulfilled, eventually.

The National Memory Grove
A further community tree-planting project was proposed by locals, to be coordinated by Jochen Gerz and his team, as a memorial to the Ballymun Towers, the seven "signature" tallest of the Ballymun Flats blocks. To be named the National Memory Grove, this would have been a densely-planted hectare of oak trees. Land was allocated by Dublin Corporation on the road from central Ballymun towards Dublin Airport, and the first 40 sponsors secured, but the project did not go ahead.

Reception and criticism
While reporting that the project was fully subscribed, and describing the artist as an "impressive figure" and "tireless negotiator" the Irish Times reported in late 2004 that there was some adverse comment about aspects of amaptocare. More than one questioned the requirement for a donation, and the artist explained that he wanted a feeling of ownership, as opposed to impersonal municipal planting. and said "that it could be possible that a work of art would not suffer from the presence of the people but, on the contrary, it would get better with the presence of the people" and that "The project is 'a little practical study of democracy'." A research project by Peter Dowie on arts projects and the Ballymun schemes also picked up some negative commentary about amaptocare, even "community animosity", with one community development worker at the Ballymun Partnership describing it as "...an arrogant proposal .. an extremely ambitious project .. very expensive with no room for evaluation .. and impractical within an area going through regeneration", an artistic director and activist referring to "patronisation of the community", and the researcher summarising some local reactions with: "The idea was that ownership of the tree would be both an inducement to, and a symbol of, their new commitment to caring for their area. Resentment toward the project stemmed from the fact it was perceived as patronizing and misunderstood the level at which residents had always demonstrated their ‘caring’ and sense of responsibility during 3 decades of civic neglect. The act of purchase also became a problem. It suggested further civic disrespect in charging residents living on social welfare for what would be given free in wealthier areas of Dublin", although in fact there was also municipally-fully funded tree planting during the area's regeneration.

Comments from artists and arts critics praised the participative and expressive nature of the work, and included art critic Jeremy Hunt saying that "Gerz has inversed [sic] the idea of imposed 'gifts' of social housing, institutional urbanism and cultural artefacts ... invited the population of Ballymun to donate, to contribute by paying for their own environment." Marion Hohlfeldt remarked that Gerz was giving residents of an area which had been the focus of a "bad news" approach the opportunity to narrate their own history, to be, as Gerz put it, "new elites" and that the project was multi-layered, and had changed the atmosphere within the district during regeneration - and a local artist involved in the scheme, John Duffy, described it as "providing a space for the donor, offering a way in which they can make a mark for themselves." and referred to one sponsor's perception of the work as "the provision of a second chance for her life in Ballymun. With the physical and emotional changes that are happening to her life, she can mark them with her words on the lectern for her tree", emphasising the "power of the project in the texts and the .. individuals and groups involved in the articulation of those words."

See also

 List of public art in Dublin

Notes

References

Footnotes

Ballymun
Public art in Ireland
Trees